Richard Edwin Stearns (born July 5, 1936) is a prominent computer scientist who, with Juris Hartmanis, received the 1993 ACM Turing Award "in recognition of their seminal paper which established the foundations for the field of computational complexity theory". In 1994 he was inducted as a Fellow of the Association for Computing Machinery.

Stearns graduated with a B.A. in mathematics from Carleton College in 1958. He then received his Ph.D. in mathematics from Princeton University in 1961 after completing a doctoral dissertation, titled Three person cooperative games without side payments, under the supervision of Harold W. Kuhn. Stearns is now Distinguished Professor Emeritus of Computer Science at the University at Albany, which is part of the State University of New York.

Bibliography 
. A first systematic study of language operations that preserve regular languages.
 . Contains the time hierarchy theorem, one of the theorems that shaped the field of computational complexity theory.
. Answers a basic question about deterministic pushdown automata: it is decidable whether a given deterministic pushdown automaton accepts a regular language.
. Introduces LL parsers, which play an important role in compiler design.

References

External links 
 
 
 

1936 births
American computer scientists
Fellows of the Association for Computing Machinery
Living people
Turing Award laureates
University at Albany, SUNY faculty
People from Caldwell, New Jersey
Princeton University alumni